St Mary Immaculate is an active Roman Catholic parish church in the town of Warwick, England. It lies to the south west of the town on West Street outside the West Gate.
The architect was Edward Welby Pugin, eldest son of the more famous Augustus Pugin. The church is built in red brick and Bath stone in the Decorated Gothic style and is a Grade II listed building. St Mary Immaculate was probably the first church in England to be dedicated to the Immaculate Conception after the definition of the dogma in 1854.

A blue plaque commemorating the marriage was unveiled in July 2018.

The church is linked to St Mary Immaculate Catholic Primary School which was originally next to the church.  This building is now the church hall and St Mary Immaculate Catholic primary school occupies a much larger site next to Priory Park.

References

External links 
 Parish website

Grade II listed churches in Warwickshire
Buildings and structures in Warwick
Roman Catholic churches in Warwickshire
Grade II listed Roman Catholic churches in England